The 2008–09 Purefoods Tender Juicy Giants season was the 21st season of the franchise in the Philippine Basketball Association (PBA).

Key dates
August 30: The 2008 PBA Draft took place in Fort Bonifacio, Taguig.
September 1: The free agency period started.

Draft picks

Roster

Depth chart

Philippine Cup

Elimination round

Standings
Legend:
y-Qualified for semifinals
x-Qualified for quarterfinals
w-Qualified for the wildcard phase
e-Eliminated

Game log

|- bgcolor="#bbffbb"
| 1
| October 8
| Red Bull
| 77-73
| Raymundo (23)
| Raymundo (15)
| Raymundo, Robinson, Salvador, Simon, R. Yap (1)
| Araneta Coliseum
| 1–0
|- bgcolor="#edbebf"
| 2
| October 10
| San Miguel
| 98–111
| J. Yap (21)
| Raymundo (8) 
| Raymundo (4)
| Cuneta Astrodome
| 1–1
|- bgcolor="#edbebf"
| 3
| October 15
| Coca-Cola
| 102–103
| J. Yap (29)
| Villanueva (13)
| R. Yap (6)
| Araneta Coliseum
| 1–2
|- bgcolor="#edbebf"
| 4
| October 18
| Sta. Lucia
| 66–69
| Raymundo (19)
| Villanueva (12)
| J. Yap, Aban (2)
| Davao del Norte
| 1–3 
|- bgcolor="#edbebf"
| 5
| October 23
| Rain or Shine
| 84–88
| Simon (23)
| Villanueva (14)
| Lanete (5)
| Olivarez Gym
| 1–4
|- bgcolor="#bbffbb"
| 6
| October 26
| Ginebra
| 92-81
| Simon (19)
| Raymundo, Villanueva (11)
| Raymundo (6)
| Araneta Coliseum
| 2–4
|- bgcolor="#bbffbb"
| 7
| October 31
| Air21
| 108-105
| Raymundo (37)
| Villanueva (17)
| Robinson (6) 
| Araneta Coliseum
| 3–4

|- bgcolor="#bbffbb"
| 8
| November 7
| Talk 'N Text Tropang Texters
| 88-87
| J. Yap (30) 
| Villanueva (12)
| Robinson (7)
| Cuneta Astrodome
| 4–4
|- bgcolor="#edbebf"
| 9
| November 9
| Alaska
| 80–95
| Belga, J. Yap (16) 
| Salvador (8)
| Robinson (5)
| Araneta Coliseum
| 4–5
|-bgcolor="#bbffbb"
| 10
| November 14
| Red Bull
| 80-72
| J. Yap (28)
| Villanueva (8)
| Robinson (4)
| Ynares Center
| 5–5
|-bgcolor="#edbebf"
| 11
| November 16
| Ginebra
| 80–90
| Yap (16)
| Robinson (12)
| J. Yap (4)
| Cuneta Astrodome
| 5–6
|-bgcolor="#edbebf"
| 12
| November 21
| Coca-Cola Tigers
| 72–93
| J. Yap, Raymundo, Villanueva (15)
| Alvarez (9)
| Lanete (6)
| Araneta Coliseum
| 5–7
|-bgcolor="#bbffbb"
| 13
| November 23
| San Miguel
| 84-83
| Raymundo (25)
| Villanueva (11)
| Robinson, Lanete (5)
| Cuneta Astrodome
| 6–7
|-bgcolor="#bbffbb"
| 14
| November 29
| Air21
| 96-88
| Raymundo (27)
| Villanueva (11)
| R. Yap (5)
| Tacloban City
| 7–7

|-bgcolor="#edbebf"
| 15
| December 6
| Rain or Shine
| 76–82
| J. Yap (32)
| Villanueva (14)
| R. Yap (5)
| Araneta Coliseum
| 7–8
|-bgcolor="#edbebf"
| 16
| December 11
| Red Bull
| 71–73
| J. Yap (20)
| Villanueva (12)
| Raymundo, R. Yap (5)
| Ynares Sports Arena
| 7–9
|-bgcolor="#bbffbb"
| 17
| December 14
| Talk 'N Text
| 96-93
| J. Yap (25)
| Villanueva (10)
| Robinson (5)
| Araneta Coliseum
| 8–9
|-bgcolor="#edbebf"
| 18
| December 21
| Alaska
| 74–76
| Raymundo (23)
| Villanueva (17)
| R. Yap (4)
| Cuneta Astrodome
| 8–10

Awards and records

Awards

Records
Note: Purefoods TJ Giants Records Only

Transactions

Trades

Free agents

Additions

Subtractions

References

Magnolia Hotshots seasons
Purefoods